The 2000 Sparkassen Cup was a tennis tournament played on indoor hard courts in Leipzig, Germany. It was part of the Tier II category of the 2000 WTA Tour. It was the 11th edition of the tournament and was held from 30 October through 5 November 2000. Unseeded Kim Clijsters won the singles title and earned $87,000 first-prize money.

Prize money

* per team

Singles main draw entrants

Seeds

Other entrants
The following players received wildcards into the singles main draw:
  Jana Kandarr
  Iva Majoli
  Barbara Rittner

The following players received entry from the singles qualifying draw:
  Evelyn Fauth
  Andrea Glass
  Janette Husárová
  Sandra Načuk

Doubles main draw entrants

Seeds

Other entrants
The following pair received a wildcard into the doubles main draw:
  Elena Dementieva /  Jana Kandarr

The following pair received entry from the doubles qualifying draw:
  Maja Matevžič /  Caroline Schneider

Finals

Singles

  Kim Clijsters defeated  Elena Likhovtseva, 7–6(8–6), 4–6, 6–4.
It was the 2nd title of the season for Clijsters and the 3rd title of her singles career.

Doubles

  Arantxa Sánchez Vicario /  Anne-Gaëlle Sidot defeated  Kim Clijsters /  Laurence Courtois, 6–7(8–6), 7–5, 6–3.
It was the 61st title for Sánchez Vicario and the 1st title for Sidot in their respective doubles careers.

References

External links
 ITF tournament edition details
 Tournament draws

Sparkassen Cup
Sparkassen Cup (tennis)
German